Matiakoali is a town in the Est Region of Burkina Faso.

Populated places in the Est Region (Burkina Faso)